Bristol Township is one of the twenty-four townships of Trumbull County, Ohio, United States.  The 2000 census found 3,154 people in the township.

Geography
Located in the northwestern part of the county, it borders the following townships:
Bloomfield Township – north
Greene Township – northeast corner
Mecca Township – east
Bazetta Township – southeast corner
Champion Township – south
Southington Township – southwest corner
Farmington Township – west
Mesopotamia Township – northwest corner

No municipalities are located in Bristol Township, although the unincorporated community of Bristolville lies at the center of the township.

Name and history
Statewide, the only other Bristol Township is located in Morgan County.

Government
The township is governed by a three-member board of trustees, who are elected in November of odd-numbered years to a four-year term beginning on the following January 1. Two are elected in the year after the presidential election and one is elected in the year before it. There is also an elected township fiscal officer, who serves a four-year term beginning on April 1 of the year after the election, which is held in November of the year before the presidential election. Vacancies in the fiscal officership or on the board of trustees are filled by the remaining trustees.

References

External links
County website

Townships in Trumbull County, Ohio
Townships in Ohio